The Last of the Summer Wine's twenty-ninth series aired on BBC One from 22 June to 31 August 2008. All of the episodes were written by Roy Clarke and produced and directed by Alan J. W. Bell.

Outline
The trio in this series consisted of:

Last appearances

Nora Batty (1973–2001, 2003–2008)

List of episodes

DVD release
The box set for series 29 was released by Universal Playback in May 2016, mislabelled as a box set for series 29 & 30.

References

Last of the Summer Wine series
2008 British television seasons